= Neelakantheswara Temple, Nizamabad =

Neelakanteswara Temple

Religion
- Affiliation: Hinduism
- District: Nizamabad
- Deity: Shiva and Parvati
- Festival: Shiva Ratri

Location
- Location: Nizamabad
- State: Telangana
- Country: India
- Interactive map of Neelakanteswara Temple
- Coordinates: 18.6854°N 78.1145°E

Architecture
- Type: Hindu temple

Neelakanteswara temple is in Nizamabad, Telangana. The presiding deities of this temple are Shiva and Parvati who is also known Neelakanta. Puranas indicate that Brahma has worshipped the idol of Lord Shiva at this temple and thus this temple is one of the most important Shiva temple in India. The temple is one of the ancient temples of India with devotees thronging to this place during the Shiva Ratri festival.
